The 2003 A3 Champions Cup was first edition of A3 Champions Cup. It was held from February 16 to 22, 2003 in Tokyo, Japan.

Participants
 Jubilo Iwata – 2002 J. League Champions
 Kashima Antlers – 2002 J. League Cup Winners
 Seongnam Ilhwa Chunma – 2002 K-League Champions
 Dalian Shide – 2002 Chinese Jia-A League Champions

Group table

Match Results
All times are Japan Standard Time (JST) – UTC+9

Awards

Winners

Individual Awards

Goalscorers

External links
goal2002.com
2003 A3 Champions Cup in RSSSF.com

A3 Champions Cup
International club association football competitions hosted by Japan
A3
A3